Polygala umbellata is a species of flowering plant in the milkwort family (Polygalaceae). It is endemic to South Africa.

References

umbellata
Flora of South Africa